Sanjar Zokirov (also Sanzhar Zakirov, ; born January 6, 1983, in Tashkent) is an Uzbek judoka, who competed in the men's extra-lightweight category. He attained a fifth-place finish in the 60-kg division at the 2002 Asian Games in Busan, South Korea, and also represented his nation Uzbekistan at the 2004 Summer Olympics.

Zokirov qualified for the Uzbek squad in the men's extra-lightweight class (60 kg) at the 2004 Summer Olympics in Athens, by placing fifth and receiving a berth from the Asian Championships in Almaty, Kazakhstan. He lost his opening match to Georgian-born Greek judoka Revazi Zintiridis, who scored an ippon victory and quickly subdued him on the tatami with a tani otoshi (valley drop) twenty-seven seconds remaining into their bout.

References

External links
 

1983 births
Living people
Uzbekistani male judoka
Olympic judoka of Uzbekistan
Judoka at the 2004 Summer Olympics
Judoka at the 2002 Asian Games
Judoka at the 2006 Asian Games
Sportspeople from Tashkent
Asian Games competitors for Uzbekistan
20th-century Uzbekistani people
21st-century Uzbekistani people